Nausana is a small village in the Bulandshahr district in the state of Uttar Pradesh, India. Nausana has a population of nearly 1,200, and the livelihood of the village is largely based on agriculture.

Geography
Nausana is situated near Nichli Ganga Nahar (Lower Ganges Canal), making the water table there fairly high. The agricultural land in the area is well irrigated.

Religion
Hinduism is the main religion of the village's inhabitants. A significant portion of the population also practices Islam.

Weather

Notable residents
Sunita Godara, Asian Marathon Champion 1992

 gavender kumar

References

Villages in Bulandshahr district